Ângelo Ponzoni Municipal Airport  is the airport serving Videira, Brazil.

It is operated by the Municipality of Videira.

History
The airport was inaugurated on November 15, 1949.

Airlines and destinations
No scheduled flights operate at this airport.

Accidents and incidents
4 August 1963: a Sadia Douglas C-49E registration PP-SLL en route from Joaçaba to Videira crashed into a hill when approaching Videira under poor visibility. All 10 occupants died.

Access

See also

List of airports in Brazil

References

External links

Airports in Santa Catarina (state)
Airports established in 1949